Beaver Woman Lake is located in Glacier National Park, in the U. S. state of Montana.

The name, Beaver Woman, was submitted to the United States Board on Geographic Names by the National Park Service in 1939 and officially approved on April 24, 1940.

See also
List of lakes in Flathead County, Montana (A-L)
Buffalo Woman Lake
Mount Pinchot (Montana)
Mount Saint Nicholas

References

Lakes of Glacier National Park (U.S.)
Lakes of Flathead County, Montana